Olav Bruvik (22 November 1913 – 30 December 1962) was a Norwegian trade unionist and politician for the Labour Party. He was the Norwegian Minister of Social Affairs from 1961 until his death.

He was born in Haus as a son of Johannes Martin Bruvik (1876–1937) and Martha Koppen (1880–1919). He worked as a blacksmith from 1930 to 1935, then after three years of education in Arna and Norrköping, he worked in the textile industry. He was a member of the Norwegian World War II resistance, and was decorated with the Defence Medal 1940 – 1945. In 1945 he became the leader of his local chapter of the Labour Party, and deputy leader of his trade union Norsk Tekstilarbeiderforbund. The trade union would become a part of Bekledningsarbeiderforbundet in 1969 and the United Federation of Trade Unions in 1988.

He chaired his trade union from 1949 to 1962, and was a member of the secretariat of the Norwegian Confederation of Trade Unions from 1953 to 1961. From 1959 to 1961 he was a deputy member of the Labour Party's central committee. From 18 February 1961 to his death he was a member of Gerhardsen's Third Cabinet, as Norwegian Minister of Social Affairs.

References

1913 births
1962 deaths
Government ministers of Norway
Labour Party (Norway) politicians
Hordaland politicians
Norwegian trade unionists
Norwegian expatriates in Sweden
Norwegian resistance members